DeKalb County is located in the north central portion of the U.S. state of Georgia. As of the 2020 census, the population was 764,382, making it Georgia's fourth-most populous county. Its county seat is Decatur.

DeKalb County is included in the Atlanta-Sandy Springs-Roswell, GA Metropolitan Statistical Area. It contains roughly 10% of the city of Atlanta (the other 90% lies in Fulton County). DeKalb is primarily a suburban county.

In 2009, DeKalb earned the Atlanta Regional Commission's "Green Communities" designation for its efforts in conserving energy, water and fuel, investing in renewable energy, reducing waste, and protecting and restoring natural resources.

In 2021, the non-profit American Rivers named DeKalb's South River the fourth-most endangered river in the United States, citing "the egregious threat that ongoing sewage pollution poses to clean water and public health."

In recent years, some communities in North DeKalb have incorporated, following a trend in other suburban areas around Metro Atlanta. Dunwoody and Brookhaven are now the largest cities that are entirely contained within the county.

History
The area of DeKalb county was acquired by the state of Georgia as a result of the 1821 Treaty of Indian Springs with a faction of the Muscogee (Creek). DeKalb County, formed in 1822 from Henry, Gwinnett and Fayette counties, took its name from Baron Johann de Kalb (1721-1780), a Bavarian-born former officer in the French Army, who fought for the Continental Army in the American Revolutionary War. The oldest existing house in the county is the 1831 Goodwin House along Peachtree Road in Brookhaven. Much of the area was forested; a section of old-growth forest is preserved at Fernbank Forest.

In 1853, Fulton County formed from the western half of DeKalb, divided along a perfectly straight and due north–south line down the middle (along which Moreland Avenue now runs). Until this time, the growing city of Atlanta had been inside DeKalb. Atlanta grew because the city of Decatur did not want to become the railroad terminus in the 1830s, thus a spot at the Thrasherville encampment in western DeKalb was picked to become Terminus and then Marthasville, before becoming Atlanta a few years after its founding. North and southwest Fulton came from two other counties: Milton and southeast Campbell, respectively. DeKalb once extended slightly further north to the Chattahoochee River, but this strip was later given to Milton, and is now the panhandle of Sandy Springs.

During the Civil War, much of the Battle of Atlanta took place in DeKalb.

Until the 1960s, DeKalb was a mainly agricultural county, but as the sprawl of the metropolitan Atlanta region expanded, DeKalb became increasingly urbanized. Finished in 1969, the eastern half of the Interstate 285 beltway, called "the Perimeter", ringed the northeastern and southern edges of the county, placing most of it "inside the Perimeter" along with nearly all of Atlanta. Interstate 675 and Georgia 400 were originally planned to connect inside the Perimeter, along with the Stone Mountain Freeway (U.S. Highway 78) connecting with the Downtown Connector (a co-signment of I-75/I-85) near Moreland Avenue, destroying many neighborhoods in western DeKalb, but community opposition in the early 1970s spared them this fate of urbanization, although part of the proposed Stone Mountain Tollway later became the Freedom Parkway.  Only Interstate 20 and Interstate 85 were successfully built through the county. DeKalb also became one of only two counties to approve MARTA rapid transit in the 1970s; the county now contains the east and northeast heavy rail lines.

In April 2018, more than 350 bus drivers for DeKalb County School District went on strike over low pay and poor working conditions, resulting in seven bus drivers being fired.

The DeKalb County seal was created in 1967, by artist Jackson Bailey. The design is based on a passage from Aristotle in which a comparison is made between human progress and the relay race. The background landscape shows planted fields, which is a tribute to DeKalb's heritage as an agrarian community and Stone Mountain, now recognized as Georgia's most popular tourist attraction. The date of the county's founding, 1822, is at the bottom of the seal.

Geography
The county is located within the upper Piedmont region of the state.

The county is crossed by the South River and numerous creeks, including Nancy Creek, Snapfinger Creek and two forks of Peachtree Creek. Peachtree Creek and Nancy Creek drain into the Chattahoochee River and eventually to the Gulf of Mexico. South River drains into the Ocmulgee River and ultimately into the Atlantic Ocean.

The southern two-thirds of DeKalb County, in a line from Druid Hills northeast to Tucker, is located in the Upper Ocmulgee River sub-basin of the Altamaha River basin, while the portion of the county north of that line is located in the Upper Chattahoochee River sub-basin of the ACF River Basin (Apalachicola-Chattahoochee-Flint River Basin).

Stone Mountain lies near the eastern border of the county. Soapstone Ridge, parallel to the southern border, was heavily quarried between 1400 and 100 BC and objects made from the soapstone have been found as far away as the Great Lakes.

Adjacent counties
 Gwinnett County – north-Northeast
 Rockdale County – east
 Henry County – south
 Clayton County – southwest
 Fulton County – west

Demographics

2020 Census

As of the 2020 United States census, there were 764,382 people, 289,829 households, and 157,737 families residing in the county.

2010 Census
As of the 2010 United States Census, there were 691,893 people, 271,809 households, and 161,453 families residing in the county. The racial makeup of the county was 54.3% black or African American, 33.3% white, 5.1% Asian, 0.4% American Indian, 4.5% from other races, and 2.4% from two or more races. Those of Hispanic or Latino origin made up 9.8% of the population. In terms of ancestry, 5.9% were English, 5.2% were German, and 3.5% were American.

Of the 271,809 households, 32.6% had children under the age of 18 living with them, 35.8% were married couples living together, 18.3% had a female householder with no husband present, 40.6% were non-families, and 31.4% of all households were made up of individuals. The average household size was 2.50 and the average family size was 3.18. The median age was 34.3 years.

The median income for a household in the county was $51,349 and the median income for a family was $60,718. Males had a median income of $43,663 versus $40,288 for females. The per capita income for the county was $28,412. About 12.4% of families and 16.1% of the population were below the poverty line, including 24.2% of those under age 18 and 11.2% of those age 65 or over.

Although Fulton County is more populous, DeKalb has the highest population density of any county in the Atlanta metropolitan area.

Economy
Major employers in DeKalb County include:
 AT&T Mobility, headquartered in the Lenox Park neighborhood of Brookhaven
 Emory Healthcare, located off of Clifton Road
 Emory University, located off of Clifton Road
 Kroger, which operates its Atlanta-area offices at 2175 Parklake Drive NE in Northlake
DeKalb County School District, headquartered in Stone Mountain

Culture

Visitor attractions
 Davidson-Arabia Mountain Nature Preserve
 Stone Mountain Park
 Fernbank Museum of Natural History
 Fernbank Science Center
 Michael C. Carlos Museum
 Callanwolde Fine Arts Center
 National Register of Historic Places listings in DeKalb County, Georgia

DeKalb County 9/11 Memorial
The DeKalb County 9/11 Memorial was dedicated on September 11, 2011.

U.S. Marine and sculptor Curtis James Miller designed a memorial that is located in front of the Dekalb County Fire and Police Headquarters. The memorial pays homage to the 343 New York Firefighters, 60 New York Police Department and Port Authority Police Officers, and the more than 2800 civilian victims of the terrorist attacks in New York City, Washington D.C., and Shanksville, Pennsylvania on September 11, 2001.

A piece of steel from one of the World Trade Center Towers in New York City is the centerpiece of this monument.

Government and politics
In recent years, along with many other counties in the Atlanta area, DeKalb County has voted strongly Democratic in presidential elections, while in the past it was more of a swing county, voting Democratic and Republican an equal number of times from 1960 until 1988. Following the 2020 United States election, there are no elected Republicans in the county. 
DeKalb is the second most Democratic-leaning county in Georgia, only behind Clayton County. 83 percent of the votes cast in the 2020 presidential election were for Joe Biden.

The current Chief Executive Officer of DeKalb County is Michael Thurmond. He took office on January 1, 2017.

Current County Commissioners as of January 2021:

Public safety

Unincorporated DeKalb County is policed by the DeKalb County Police Department; the DeKalb Sheriff's Office, which is responsible for serving criminal warrants and securing the courts and county jail; and the DeKalb Marshal's Office, which serves civil processes issued through state court, such as evictions.

Fire services are provided throughout the county by DeKalb County Fire and Rescue.  Previously, DeKalb County Fire and Rescue also provided emergency medical services throughout the county; however, in 2013, the county signed a contract with American Medical Response to provide emergency medical services to the county.

Federal representation

The Centers for Disease Control and Prevention is based in the Druid Hills CDP in an unincorporated area in the county. The Federal Bureau of Investigation Atlanta Field Office is located in Chamblee.

State representation
The Georgia Department of Juvenile Justice has its headquarters in Avondale Estates, near Decatur. The Georgia Bureau of Investigation has its headquarters near Decatur, in an unincorporated area.

The Metro State Prison of the Georgia Department of Corrections was formerly located in an unincorporated area in DeKalb County. Female death row inmates (UDS, "under death sentence") resided in the Metro State Prison. The prison was closed in 2011.

United States Congress

Georgia General Assembly

Georgia State Senate

Georgia House of Representatives

Diplomatic missions
The Consulate-General of Mexico in Atlanta is located in the North Druid Hills CDP. The Consulate-General of Guatemala in Atlanta is located in the North Atlanta CDP. The Consulate-General of Peru in Atlanta is located in the city of Brookhaven."

Transportation

Major roads and expressways

Mass transit
Xpress GA / RTA commuter buses and MARTA heavy rail subway and buses serve the county.

Pedestrians and cycling
Currently, there are plans for the construction of a multi-use trail, known as the Peachtree Creek Greenway. The goal of the greenway is to provide residents with close-to-home and close-to-work access to bicycle and pedestrian trails, serve transportation and recreation needs, and help encourage quality of life and sustainable economic growth. The trail will connect the cities of Atlanta, Brookhaven, Chamblee and Doraville.

 Arabia Mountain Path
 Chamblee Rail Trail
 Hill Loop Trail
 Nancy Creek Trail
 Peachtree Creek Greenway (under construction)
 South Peachtree Creek Trail
 Stone Mountain Trail (under construction)

Education

Primary and secondary education

Public schools

The portion of DeKalb County not within the city of Atlanta or the city of Decatur is served by DeKalb County School District (formerly DeKalb County School System). The Atlanta portion is served by Atlanta Public Schools. The Decatur portion is served by Decatur City School District.

On December 17, 2012, the Southern Association of Colleges and Schools announced that it had downgraded the DeKalb County Schools System's status from "on advisement" to "on probation" and warned the school system that the loss of their accreditation was "imminent."

Private schools
Private schools in DeKalb County include:
 Atlanta Jewish Academy Upper School (former Yeshiva Atlanta) in Doraville
 Benjamin Franklin Academy (unincorporated area)
 Howard Scholars Academy (Decatur)
 Marist School (Brookhaven)
 Mohammed Schools (unincorporated area)
 Paideia School (Atlanta)
 Saint Thomas More Catholic Elementary & Middle School (Decatur)
 St. Pius X Catholic High School (Chamblee)
 Friends School of Atlanta (Decatur)
 Waldorf School of Atlanta (Decatur)
 Academe of the Oaks (Decatur)

From its opening in 1990 until 2003, the Seigakuin Atlanta International School was located on the property of Oglethorpe University in Brookhaven, an unincorporated area.

Higher education

Agnes Scott College is a private, all female, undergraduate liberal arts college in Decatur.

Emory University is a private, coeducational, liberal arts university. It is a member of the Association of American Universities, an association of leading research universities in the US and Canada. The university consists of the following divisions: Emory College of Arts and Science, the Laney Graduate School, Candler School of Theology, Goizueta Business School, Emory University School of Law, Rollins School of Public Health, and the Nell Hodgson Woodruff School of Nursing.

Mercer University is a private, coeducational, faith-based university with a Baptist heritage. Its main campus is in Macon. The Cecil B. Day Graduate and Professional Campus is in DeKalb County; it houses the College of Nursing, the College of Pharmacy and Health Sciences, and the James and Carolyn McAfee School of Theology along with programs of the Eugene W. Stetson School of Business and Economics, the School of Medicine, and the Tift College of Education.

Oglethorpe University is a private, coeducational, liberal arts school in Brookhaven and is named after James Oglethorpe, founder of the Georgia Colony.

Georgia Perimeter College (formerly DeKalb College) has three campuses within the county and offers two-year associate degrees.

Georgia Military College (GMC) has a satellite campus in Stone Mountain Village.

Georgia Piedmont Technical College (formerly DeKalb Technical College) is the largest vocational institution in Georgia. Georgia Piedmont Technical College trains students in business, engineering, technologies, health, human services, industrial arts, information systems, and transportation.

DeVry University offers bachelor's and master's degrees in healthcare, accounting, business, and management technology.

Columbia Theological Seminary is a theological institution of the Presbyterian Church (USA) in Decatur. More than 640 students are enrolled at Columbia in one of five degree programs: Master of Divinity, Master of Arts in Theological Studies, Master of Theology, Doctor of Ministry, and Doctor of Theology.

Luther Rice College and Seminary is a private Christian college and seminary in Lithonia. It offers bachelors, masters, and doctoral programs in ministry and ministry-related programs.

Public libraries
The DeKalb County Public Library has 22 branches throughout the county.

Communities

Cities

 Atlanta (part)
 Avondale Estates
 Brookhaven
 Chamblee
 Clarkston
 Decatur
 Doraville
 Dunwoody
 Lithonia
 Pine Lake
 Stonecrest
 Stone Mountain
 Tucker

Census-designated places

 Belvedere Park
 Candler-McAfee
 Druid Hills
 Gresham Park
 North Decatur
 North Druid Hills (also known as Briarcliff or Toco Hills)
 Panthersville
 Redan
 Scottdale

Unincorporated communities

 Buford Highway
 Collinsville
 Conley (partly)
 Ellenwood
 Embry Hills
 Flair Forest
 Lenox Park (neighborhood in Brookhaven)
 Northlake
 Pittsburg
 Smoke Rise
 Snapfinger

Ghost town
 Constitution

See also
 National Register of Historic Places listings in DeKalb County, Georgia
 Dekalb County District Attorney's Office
 DeKalb County School District
 Sidney Dorsey, Former sheriff & murderer
List of counties in Georgia

Bibliography
 DeKalb Historical Society. Vanishing DeKalb: A Pictorial History. Decatur, Ga.: DeKalb Historical Society, 1985. 
 Mason, Herman. "Skip" Jr. African-American Life in DeKalb County, 1821–1970. Charleston, S.C.: Arcadia Publishing, 1998. 
 Owens, Sue Ellen, and Megan Milford. DeKalb County in Vintage Postcards. Charleston, S.C.: Arcadia Publishing, 2001. 
 Price, Vivian. The History of DeKalb County, Georgia, 1822–1900. Fernandina Beach, Fla.: Wolfe Publishing Company, 1997.

References

External links

 DeKalb County official website
 DeKalb History Center
 DeKalb Convention and Visitors Bureau
 DeKalb Elections Research Guide 
 DeKalb County historical marker

 
Georgia (U.S. state) counties
Counties in the Atlanta metropolitan area
1822 establishments in Georgia (U.S. state)
Populated places established in 1822
Black Belt (U.S. region)
Majority-minority counties in Georgia